Mount Queen Elizabeth is located on the border of Alberta and British Columbia, directly east of Mount King Albert. It was named in 1916 by interprovincial boundary surveyors after Queen Elisabeth of Belgium. Note that Elisabeth is the correct spelling of her name.

See also
 List of peaks on the British Columbia–Alberta border

References

Two-thousanders of Alberta
Two-thousanders of British Columbia
Canadian Rockies